Upplandsmuseet is the county museum of Uppsala County, Sweden. 

The institution is responsible for preservation and conducting research in the area of the cultural history and archaeology of the county, including the city of Uppsala (parts of the historical province of Uppland, from which the museum takes its name, belong to Stockholm County). The permanent exhibition covers subjects such as the history of the city, of Uppsala Cathedral, and of student life at Uppsala University. Public activities are conducted in the Akademikvarnen, the open air museum Disagården in Gamla Uppsala and at  Walmstedtska gården  in the Karin district of Uppsala.

The former water mill  was completed in 1768. It remained in operation until 1946. Between 1957 and 1959 the mill's premises were rebuilt to house the Uppland Museum. The exterior of the building was used by Ingmar Bergman for the bishop's house in the film Fanny and Alexander (1982).

References

External links
Upplandsmuseet website

Museums in Uppsala
History museums in Sweden